Nordstromia niva is a moth in the family Drepanidae. It was described by Hong-Fu Chu and Lin-Yao Wang in 1988. It is found in Hubei, China.

Adults can be distinguished from other related species by the powdery white colour and the smaller size.

References

Moths described in 1988
Drepaninae
Moths of Asia